Jane Addams High School may refer to:

 Jane Addams Business Careers Center - Cleveland, Ohio
 Jane Addams High School for Academic Careers - Bronx, New York City

See also
 Adams High School (disambiguation)